aka  and  is a 2009 Japanese science-fiction fantasy pink film directed by Naoyuki Tomomatsu. Among the awards it won at the Pink Grand Prix ceremony was the Silver Prize for Best Film.

Synopsis
In the near future, Ueno is a man who has been raised with his parents' cyborg maid Maria. His parents pass away while he is a teenager, leaving Maria to care for Ueno. As an adult, Ueno's attachment to Maria leads him to attempt to program her for sex. This attempted consummation of their relationship fails, and when Ueno is an old man, Maria's power supply comes to an end, leaving Ueno alone. Meanwhile, a series of rapes occur in the city and Detective Yuri Akagi suspects a droid is responsible.

Cast
 Akiho Yoshizawa as Maria
 Anri Suzuki as Yuri
 Yōko Satomi as Woman A
 Mari Yamaguchi as Fiancee
 Masayoshi Nogami as Old Man
 Hiroyuki Kaneko as Rape Machine
 如春 as Ueno
 Hiroshi Fujita as Otaku critic
 Abō as Detective
 Kōji Senō (妹尾公資) as Detective

Critical appraisal
Maid-Droid won several honors at the annual Pink Grand Prix. Besides winning the second place in the Best Film category, Naoyuki Tomomatsu was awarded Best Director for his work on this film. Prizes for Best Actor (Masayoshi Nogami) and Best Screenplay (Chisato Ōgawara) were also given for Maid-Droid.

The German-language site molodezhnaja, however, gives Maid-Droid a less-than-positive review, awarding it two out of five stars. While admitting that it can be enjoyed for its trashiness, and some good sex scenes, the review complains about the perceived misogynistic message behind the film. A scene in which young robots are praised while women over 30 are labeled "ugly" and physically abused for this reason is singled out as a particularly offensive jab at feminism. The review concludes that despite a few interesting ideas, the film as a whole is a clumsy misfire on the part of director Tomomatsu.

Availability
Maid-Droid was released under the title  as an original video in Japan in 2008. The pink film studio, Xces gave the film a theatrical release in Japan on January 30, 2009 under the title . It was released on DVD in Japan on March 6, 2009 under the title . Cinema Epoch released Maid-Droid on DVD in the US through its Tokyo Erotique series on December 22, 2009.

References

External links
 
 
 
 
 
 

2009 films
Erotic fantasy films
Films directed by Naoyuki Tomomatsu
2000s Japanese-language films
Pink films
Android (robot) films
2000s Japanese films